Salter Oval (known prior to 1945 as the West End Recreation Reserve) is a cricket ground in Bundaberg, Queensland, Australia.  The first recorded match on the ground came in 1948 when Queensland Country Women played England Women.  It held its only first-class match in 1981 when Queensland played the touring New Zealanders.  Two List A matches have been played there.  The first came in 1991 when Queensland played the touring West Indians, while the second saw Queensland play the touring Zimbabweans in 1995.

In February 2016, Brisbane Broncos played North Queensland Cowboys in a National Rugby League trial fixture, with the attendance figure reported at 8,122.

Salter Oval hosted Bundaberg's first National Rugby League match for premiership points on August 7, 2022 when the Canterbury-Bankstown Bulldogs took on the North Queensland Cowboys.

NRL Games

References

External links
Salter Oval at ESPNcricinfo
Salter Oval at CricketArchive
Salter Oval at Austadiums
[]

Buildings and structures in Bundaberg
Cricket grounds in Queensland
Sports venues completed in 1945